Gabriele Hess (born 1 April 1971 in Leipzig, Saxony) is a German, former cross-country skier who competed from 1989 to 1993. Competing at the 1992 Winter Olympics, she had her best career finish of eighth in the 4 × 5 km relay and her best individual finish of 14th in the 5 km + 10 km combined pursuit.

Hess' best finish at the FIS Nordic World Ski Championships was sixth in the 10 km event at Val di Fiemme in 1991. Her best World Cup finish was second twice in 30 km events in 1989 and 1990 which were also her best career finishes.

Cross-country skiing results
All results are sourced from the International Ski Federation (FIS).

Olympic Games

World Championships

World Cup

Season standings

Individual podiums
 2 podiums

References

External links

Women's 4 x 5 km cross-country relay Olympic results: 1976-2002 

1971 births
Cross-country skiers at the 1992 Winter Olympics
German female cross-country skiers
Living people
Olympic cross-country skiers of Germany
Sportspeople from Leipzig